Eduardo Zuleta (born 19 November 1935) is a right-handed former noted Ecuadorian international tennis player. He competed in the Davis Cup in 1961 and 1963.  Eduardo competed on the U.S. as well as the European summer tennis circuit in the late 1950s-to late 1970s, with notably more success on slow clay surfaces, on which he was a very steady and indefatigable retriever, than on the faster grass, which was a much more popular surface in his day than it is today.  When not on the tournament circuit he practiced in Miami, where he was well known for hitting against a wall for hours, which gave him callouses on his racket hand a good quarter of an inch thick that he would shave down at night with a razor blade. He toured at times with Ecuadorians Washington Suarez and Davis Cupper Miguel Olvera.  Zuleta had the nickname El Barco ("The Ship") in his home country because he invariably returned there from his tennis tours with suitcases full of tennis equipment and clothing that he received free from manufacturers as goodwill advertising. Perhaps his most conspicuous debut on the tennis stage was his first-round encounter on the grass of the U.S. Championships at Forest Hills, NY in 1963 with then U.S. No. 1 Chuck McKinley, who had just won Wimbledon two months earlier. The outcome was a foregone conclusion in straight sets, but Eduardo put up a creditable fight.

References 

1935 births
Living people
Ecuadorian male tennis players
Tennis players at the 1963 Pan American Games
Pan American Games competitors for Ecuador